The 1999 AFL Women's National Championships took place in Perth, Western Australia, Australia. The tournament began on 19 June and ended on 24 June 1999. The 1999 tournament was the 8th Championship. The Senior-vics of Victoria won the 1999 Championship, defeating Western Australia in the final. It was Victoria's 9th consecutive title.

Ladder
  Victoria-Senior
  Western Australia
  Queensland
  Australian Capital Territory
  Northern Territory
  Australian Capital Territory
  South Australia
  New South Wales

All-Australian Team

External links
National Results from the AFL site

1999
1999 in Australian rules football
AFL